Mitchell "Mitch" Gornto (born February 25, 1997 in Montgomery, Ohio) is an American artistic gymnast. He is currently a member of the University of Michigan Men's Gymnastic Team.

References

External links
 Twitter 

1997 births
Living people
American male artistic gymnasts
People from Burlington, North Carolina
Michigan Wolverines men's gymnasts
Sportspeople from North Carolina
20th-century American people
21st-century American people